Glenville is an unincorporated community in York County, Pennsylvania, United States.

Notable people
Donora Hillard, author
Todd Peck, NASCAR driver
Burnell Doll, Towns most admirable man(and farmer)
Shannon Doll, 1991-92 Dairy Princess

References

Unincorporated communities in York County, Pennsylvania
Unincorporated communities in Pennsylvania